Sota (Finnish for "war") is the first EP by the black metal band Horna. It was released on Sinister Productions in 1999 with a limit of 666 copies, though only 200-300 copies are believed to exist. It has not been re-released.

Track listing

Personnel

Additional personnel
 Christophe Szpajdel - logo

External links
Metal Archives
Official Horna Site

1999 EPs
Horna EPs